2004 Nabire earthquake may refer to: 
February 2004 Nabire earthquakes
November 2004 Nabire earthquake